Kattupakkam is a suburb of Chennai, Tamil Nadu, India. It is located in the western side of the city.

Location 
Kattupakkam is located 20 kilometres from Fort St George on the Mount-Poonamallee Road. The nearest bus depot is at Iyyappanthangal, which is one kilometre from Kattupakkam, while the nearest railway station is at Guindy, 8 kilometres away. Kattupakkam is near to the Mangadu Amman temple. Tiruverkadu Karumari Amman Temple is about 5 kilometers from here. The Sri Ramachandra Medical College and Research Institute is about 2 kilometers.

Landmarks 
Kattupakkam has a number of temples, mosques and churches. The Sri Vada Chendur Murugan Temple at Kattupakkam is one of the oldest Hindu temples built in the city. Pillayar Kovil on the Sendurpuram Main Road is another old temple.

Neighbourhoods in Chennai